The widenose guitarfish (Glaucostegus obtusus) is a species of fish in the Rhinobatidae family. It is found in Bangladesh, Indonesia, Malaysia, Myanmar, Pakistan, Sri Lanka, and Thailand. Its natural habitats are open seas, shallow seas, coral reefs, and estuarine waters.

References 

widenose guitarfish
Fish of Bangladesh
widenose guitarfish
Taxonomy articles created by Polbot